Bartnes is a village in the municipality of Steinkjer in Trøndelag county, Norway. The village is located in the western part of Steinkjer in the Beitstad area. It lies along the shore of the innermost part of the Trondheimsfjord, across from the large village of Malm. Bartnes Church is located in this village. Bartnes is a very old settlement, with many historical findings in the surrounding area.

References

Villages in Trøndelag
Steinkjer